Sopris may refer to:

Sopris, Colorado, an unincorporated community
Mount Sopris, a mountain in Colorado
Richard Sopris, a Colorado politician

See also
Sopris National Forest
Sopris phase